Placodiscus oblongifolius is a forest tree in the family Sapindaceae. It is endemic to lowland rain forests of West Africa, with the best studied populations in Ghana.

References

oblongifolius
Flora of West Tropical Africa
Trees of Africa
Vulnerable plants
Taxonomy articles created by Polbot